The J.C. Bartlett House is a historic house located in Taunton, Massachusetts. The house was built in 1880 for J.C. Bartlett, a prosperous mining engineer. It was added to the National Register of Historic Places in 1984.

The large-scaled Mansard house features bold Italianate details in its justified quoins, bracketed cornice and window detailing. It originally had decorative iron cresting on its roof, that has since been removed. The exterior has been partially covered with vinyl siding. The original slate Mansard roof has been replaced with asphalt shingles.

See also
National Register of Historic Places listings in Taunton, Massachusetts
List of historic houses in Massachusetts

References

Houses in Taunton, Massachusetts
National Register of Historic Places in Taunton, Massachusetts
Houses on the National Register of Historic Places in Bristol County, Massachusetts